This article lists the heads of state of Cuba from 1902 until the present day.

Between 1902 and 1976 (under the 1901 and the 1940 constitutions), the role of the head of state was performed by the President of Cuba.

Between 1976 and 2019 (under the 1976 Constitution), the position of President was abolished and replaced by the President of the Council of State.

On 24 February 2019 (under the 2019 Constitution), the position of President was restored.

The current president (until 10 October 2019, officially called President of the Council of State) is Miguel Díaz-Canel, since 19 April 2018.

Presidents of Cuba

Republic of Cuba (1902–1906)

Second Occupation of Cuba (1906–1909)

Republic of Cuba (1909–1959)

Republic of Cuba (1959–present)

See also
Cuba
Captaincy General of Cuba
United States Military Government in Cuba
Republic of Cuba (1902–1959)
List of colonial governors of Cuba
Council of State (Cuba)
President of Cuba
Vice President of Cuba
Council of Ministers (Cuba)
Prime Minister of Cuba
List of heads of government of Cuba
Guantanamo Bay Naval Base
List of commanders of Guantanamo Bay Naval Base
Lists of office-holders
List of current heads of state and government

References

External links
World Statesmen.org: profile of Cuba

.
Heads of state
Cuba
Heads of state
.
.